The 2010 Open de Moselle was a tennis tournament played on indoor hard courts. It was the eighth edition of the Open de Moselle, and is part of the ATP World Tour 250 Series of the 2010 ATP World Tour. It was held at the Arènes de Metz in Metz, France, from 20 September until 26 September 2010. Eighth-seeded Gilles Simon won the singles title.

Entrants

Seeds

 Seeds are based on the rankings of 13 September 2010.

Other entrants
The following players received wildcards into the singles main draw:
  Thierry Ascione
  Marin Čilić
  Adrian Mannarino

The following players received entry from the qualifying draw:
  Thomas Fabbiano
  Édouard Roger-Vasselin
  Igor Sijsling
  Mischa Zverev

The following player received the lucky losers spots:
  Federico Delbonis
  Nicolas Mahut

Finals

Singles

 Gilles Simon defeated  Mischa Zverev 6–3, 6–2
 It was Simon's first title of the year, and the seventh of his career.

Doubles

 Dustin Brown /  Rogier Wassen defeated  Marcelo Melo /  Bruno Soares, 6–3, 6–3

References

External links
 Official website